Srđan Mrvaljević (born 16 May 1984, in Belgrade) is a Montenegrin judoka. He competed in the men's 81 kg event at the 2008 Summer Olympics. In 2011 he was elected "best athlete of Montenegro" by the Montenegrin Olympic Committee. He competed for Montenegro at the 2012 Summer Olympics as well. He also competed at the 2016 Summer Olympics in the men's 81 kg event.

References

External links
 
 

Judoka at the 2008 Summer Olympics
1984 births
Sportspeople from Belgrade
Montenegrin male judoka
Montenegrin people of Serbian descent
Olympic judoka of Montenegro
Living people
Judoka at the 2012 Summer Olympics
Judoka at the 2016 Summer Olympics
Mediterranean Games gold medalists for Montenegro
Competitors at the 2013 Mediterranean Games
Mediterranean Games medalists in judo
European Games competitors for Montenegro
Judoka at the 2015 European Games
Judoka at the 2019 European Games